Barbosella australis is a species of orchid endemic to Brazil. It is known from the States of São Paulo and Rio Grande do Sul.

References

australis
Orchids of Brazil
Plants described in 1906
Taxa named by Alfred Cogniaux